The following is a list of Dayak groups and their respective languages in West Kalimantan province, Indonesia:

List

See also
Dayak people

References

West Kalimantan
Dayak
Dayak